The yellow-throated leafbird (Chloropsis palawanensis) is a species of bird in the family Chloropseidae.
It is endemic to the Palawan in the Philippines.

Its natural habitat is subtropical or tropical moist lowland forest.

The Palawan leafbird (Chloropsis palawanensis) is a small bird with broad wings and a long tail that's easily recognizable by its green body color and yellow throat. Its green color makes it very hard to see among the green leaves of the forest canopy, hence the name "leafbird".

The Palawan leafbird is commonly found in forest, forest edge, and scrub. It uses its pointed slender bill to feed on insects and small fruits in the forest canopy, where it often forms mixed flocks with bulbuls. It is a fairly common to common species endemic to Palawan. The Palawan leafbird is found in Balabac, Busuanga, Calauit, Coron, Culion, Dumaran, and mainland Palawan.

References

yellow-throated leafbird
Birds of Palawan
Endemic birds of the Philippines
yellow-throated leafbird
Taxonomy articles created by Polbot